Bipolarity may refer to:
Polarity in international relations
Bipolar disorder in psychiatry
An object with an electromagnetic field which is not a magnetic monopole
A dipole antenna in radio broadcasting

See also
Bipolar (disambiguation)